Caernarvon Castle is a painting by J.M.W. Turner (23 April 1775 - 19 December 1851), painted c. 1798.

This painting uses watercolor on an "ambitious scale" in a way that stands alongside oil paintings of the time.

References

Paintings by J. M. W. Turner